The 2019 Merrimack Warriors football team represented Merrimack College in the 2019 NCAA Division I FCS football season. They were led by seventh-year head coach Dan Curran and played their home games at Duane Stadium. They were first year members of the Northeast Conference.

Previous season

The Warriors finished the 2018 season 5–5, 5–4 in NE-10 Conference play to finish in seventh place.

Preseason

Preseason coaches' poll
The NEC released their preseason coaches' poll on July 24, 2019. The Warriors were not ranked due to their transition to NCAA Division I and their lack of a full conference schedule.

Schedule

Game summaries

Virginia–Lynchburg

at Central Connecticut

at Saint Francis (PA)

Mayville State

at Lehigh

Bryant

at Delaware State

Presbyterian

at Rhode Island

Franklin Pierce

at LIU

Footnotes

References

Merrimack
Merrimack Warriors football seasons
Merrimack Warriors football